Dowall is a surname. Notable people
with the surname include:

John Dowall, New Zealand paralympic athlete 
Shaun Kenny-Dowall (born 1988), New Zealand Rugby League footballer
Willie Dowall (1907–1972), Scottish footballer

See also
Dowell (surname) 
McDowall (surname)